Sardar Muhammad Chaudhry (1937–2004) practised law briefly and then joined the Police Service of Pakistan in 1963. He served in the field but the major portion of his career was spent in the Intelligence, FIA and Narcotics Control Board. His last position, before retiring in March 1997, was as Inspector General of Police Punjab, the largest and the most important province of Pakistan. Because of his rich experience and deep insight he emerged as a guide, a wise counsel of the police and government. He is held in high esteem by police force as well as the general public for his high integrity, fairplay and humane approach. He wrote many books after his retirement.

He is author of following books in English and Urdu.

 The Ultimate Crime
 Jahan-e-Hairat 
 Punjab Police Such kia Hai
 Quaid-e-Azam Biswein Sadi Ka Sub Say Bara Insaan
 Nawaz Sharif Teri Rahoon Ka Seeda Musafir
 kisht-e-Wiran
 Mata-e-Faqeer
 Rawish Rawish Roshane
 The Trail Blazer
 Police Crime and Politics

References

External links
Official website

1937 births
2004 deaths
Punjabi people
People from Lahore
Government College University, Lahore alumni
Pakistani Sunni Muslims
Federal Investigation Agency agents
Pakistani police chiefs